Montecalvo in Foglia is a comune (municipality) in the Province of Pesaro e Urbino in the Italian region Marche, located about  northwest of Ancona and about  southwest of Pesaro.

Montecalvo in Foglia borders the following municipalities:  Mondaino, Tavullia, Urbino, Vallefoglia.

References

Cities and towns in the Marche